The 1929 College Basketball All-Southern Team consisted of basketball players from the South chosen at their respective positions.

All-Southerns

Guards
Billy Werber, Duke (LB-1)
Louis McGinnis, Kentucky (LB-1)
Maurice Johnson, NC State (LB-2)
Dewitt Laird, Mississippi (LB-2)

Forwards
Robert Selby, Mississippi (LB-1)
Larry Haar, NC State (LB-2)
Henry Palmer, Georgia (LB-2)

Center
Frank Goodwin, NC State (LB-1)
Sandford Sanford, Georgia (LB-1 [as f])
Joe Croson, Duke (LB-2)

Key
LB = chosen by Lester Belding, UNC scout.

References

All-Southern